Eeva-Johanna Eloranta (born 4 March 1966 in Turku) is a Finnish politician currently serving in the Parliament of Finland for the Social Democratic Party of Finland at the Finland Proper constituency.

References

1966 births
Living people
People from Turku
Social Democratic Party of Finland politicians
Members of the Parliament of Finland (2011–15)
Members of the Parliament of Finland (2015–19)
Members of the Parliament of Finland (2019–23)
Women members of the Parliament of Finland
21st-century Finnish women politicians